IPass may refer to:

 I-Pass, an electronic toll collection system in Illinois, United States
 iPASS (Taiwan), a contactless smartcard used in Taiwan
 iPass (company), a technology company headquartered in California, United States
 A mini-SAS electrical connector